Gentleman on Time is a 1924 German silent film directed by Karl Gerhardt and starring Carlo Aldini.

The film's sets were designed by the art director Willi Herrmann.

Cast
In alphabetical order

References

External links

1924 films
Films of the Weimar Republic
Films directed by Karl Gerhardt
German silent feature films
German black-and-white films
Phoebus Film films
1920s German films